Marinho is both a given name and a Portuguese surname. Notable people with the name include:

Given name
Marinho Peres (born 1947), a Brazilian footballer

Surname
António Marinho e Pinto (born 1950), Portuguese lawyer and former journalist, and member of the European Parliament
Carlos Henrique Carneiro Marinho (born 1993), a Brazilian footballer
David Luiz (David Luiz Moreira Marinho; born 1987), a Brazilian footballer
Jair Marinho de Oliveira (1936–2020), a Brazilian footballer
João Roberto Marinho (born 1953), Brazilian businessman
José Roberto Marinho (born 1955), Brazilian businessman
Lily Marinho (1921–2011), Brazilian philanthropist and socialite
Maneca (Manuel Marinho Alves; 1926–1961)
Marcelo dos Santos Marinho (born 1984), a Brazilian footballer
Marinho Chagas (Francisco das Chagas Marinho; 1952–2014), a Brazilian footballer
Roberto Irineu Marinho (born 1947), Brazilian businessman
Roberto Marinho (1904–2003), a Brazilian publisher and businessman
Wellington Damião Nogueira Marinho (born 1981), a Brazilian footballer

Nickname
Mairon César Reis (born 1979), a Brazilian footballer
Marinho (footballer, born 1943), a Portuguese footballer
Marinho (footballer, born 1955), a Brazilian footballer
Marinho (footballer, born 1957) (1957–2020), a Brazilian footballer
Marinho (footballer, born 1970), a Portuguese footballer
Marinho (footballer, born 1983), a Portuguese footballer
Marinho (futsal player), a Portuguese futsal player
Marinho (footballer, born 1990), a Brazilian footballer

See also
Cerradomys marinhus, a species of rodent known as the Marinho rice rat or Marinho's oryzomys
Marino (disambiguation)
Mariño

Portuguese-language surnames